Helen Audrey Beecham (21 July 1915 – 31 January 1989) was an English poet, teacher and historian.

She was born in Weaverham in 1915. Her grandfather was Sir Joseph Beecham, 1st Baronet, eldest son of Thomas Beecham, who had created a fortune with Beecham's Pills. Her uncle was the conductor Sir Thomas Beecham and her father devoted time to spending his inheritance. She took PPE at Somerville College in Oxford. She left with a second class degree and went to live in Paris in the group that included Henry Miller. She made a lasting friendship with the writers Lawrence Durrell and Anais Nin.

Beecham left Oxford and took a job at the University of Nottingham in 1950; she lectured and headed Nightingale Hall. One anecdote tells of how when faced with demonstrating students intent on occupying one of the buildings she hid the weapons but supplied them with toilet paper. She memorably
noted that revolutionaries frequently forgot the loo rolls.

Sir Maurice Bowra, Warden of Wadham and Vice-Chancellor of Oxford was engaged to her. Bowra, a homosexual, explained his engagement by saying "buggers can't be choosers". In 1957, she published her first book of poetry, The Coast of Barbary.

Death
Helen Audrey Beecham died in Churchill Hospital, Churchill Hospital, Oxford, England in 1989, aged 73, from asthma.

References

1915 births
1989 deaths
People from Northwich
English women poets
Alumni of Somerville College, Oxford
20th-century English poets
20th-century English women writers
20th-century English educators
20th-century English historians
Respiratory disease deaths in England
Deaths from asthma
English women non-fiction writers
British women historians
20th-century women educators